Chișinău was a county of Moldova from 1998 to 2003. Its population in 2003 was 382,400. Its capital was Chișinău, which was not part of the county.

It was bordered by the counties of Orhei, Ungheni, Lăpușna, and Tighina, and by Transnistria.

External links
 Counties of Moldova, Statoids.com

Counties of Moldova
Counties of Bessarabia
1998 establishments in Moldova
2003 disestablishments in Moldova
States and territories established in 1998
States and territories disestablished in 2003